Go Away from My World is the third studio album by British singer Marianne Faithfull. It was released only in the United States. Andrew Loog Oldham was the executive producer with David Bailey and Gered Mankowitz credited for the photography.

Though the song "Come My Way" had been released on a previous album and only in the United Kingdom, the version on that album was from a different session and a considerably different performance than that included here.

Track listing
 "Go Away from My World" (Jon Mark)
 "Yesterday" (John Lennon, Paul McCartney)
 "Come My Way" (Traditional)
 "The Last Thing on My Mind" (Tom Paxton)
 "How Should True Love" (Alfred Deller)
 "Wild Mountain Time" (Francis McPeake)
 "Summer Nights" (Brian Henderson, Liza Strike)
 "Mary Ann" (Traditional)
 "Scarborough Fair" (Traditional)
 "Lullabye" (Jon Mark)
 "North Country Maid" (Traditional)
 "Sally Free and Easy" (Cyril Tawney)

References

1965 albums
Marianne Faithfull albums
London Records albums